Pitkin is a surname. Notable people with the surname include:

 Frederick Walker Pitkin, Governor of Colorado from 1879 to 1883
 Hanna Fenichel Pitkin, writer and philosopher
 Henry Pitkin, American pioneer watchmaker, silversmith and businessman 
 Joan Breslin Pitkin, American state delegate
John R. G. Pitkin, American politician
 Lorraine J. Pitkin, American women's activist
 Timothy Pitkin, American congressman
 Walter B. Pitkin, American philosopher